Moses and the Shepherd may refer to:

 Moses and the Shepherd (album)
 Moses and the Shepherd (story)